Ashes of Ares is an American power metal band featuring ex-Iced Earth members Matt Barlow on vocals and Freddie Vidales on guitar. It previously included drummer Van Williams (formerly of the band Nevermore).

History 
In June 2012, Barlow announced on his Facebook page the creation of a new band with former Iced Earth bassist Freddie Vidales and Nevermore drummer Van Williams. Later that year the band signed with Nuclear Blast Records and entered Morrisound studio and recorded their debut self-titled album. The album was released on September 6, 2013. 
The band went on tour around Europe with Powerwolf and Battle Beast in September/October 2013.

On February 13, 2017, the band announced drummer Williams had left the band he co-founded. The decision was described as "both mutual and amicable." Williams moved on to play with the band Ghost Ship Octavius. In October 2018 the band has released its second album.

Discography 
 Ashes of Ares (2013)
 Well of Souls (2018)
 Throne of Iniquity (EP) (2020)
 Emperors and Fools (2022)

References

External links 
 Ashes Of Ares on Facebook

American power metal musical groups
Musical groups established in 2012
Nuclear Blast artists
2012 establishments in the United States